Chetty or Chetti is the surname of:

 Chris Chetti (born 1974), American retired professional wrestler
 Cody Chetty (born 1991), South African former first-class cricketer 
 G. Janakiram Chetty (born 1906), Indian merchant and politician
 G. N. Chetty (1881–1950), Indian merchant, landlord, politician, legislator and economist
 Gazulu Lakshminarasu Chetty (1806–1868), Indian merchant and political activist
 Ilyes Chetti (born 1995), Algerian footballer
 Jonnalagadda Gurappa Chetty, Indian painter, craftsman and writer
 K. P. Puttanna Chetty (1856–1938), British Indian administrator, bureaucrat and philanthropist
 Mergan Chetty (born 1968), South African politician
 Nalli Kuppuswami Chetti (born 1940), Indian textile industrialist and philanthropist
 P. Theagaraya Chetty (1852–1925), Indian lawyer, industrialist and political leader, one of the founders of the Justice Party
 R. K. Shanmukham Chetty (1892–1953), Indian lawyer, economist and politician, first finance minister of India
 Raj Chetty (born 1979), Indian-born American economist
 Sami Venkatachalam Chetty (died 1958), Indian politician, businessman and Indian independence activist
 Simon Casie Chetty (1807–1860), Ceylonese civil servant, author and politician
 Sylvie Chetty, New Zealand marketing academic
 T. Namberumal Chetty (c. 1856–1925), Indian contractor, engineer, builder and businessman
 T. R. A. Thumboo Chetty (1837–1907), first Indian chief judge of the Chief Court of Mysore
 Trisha Chetty (born 1988), South Africa cricketer